A general election was held in the U.S. state of New Mexico on November 2, 2010. All of New Mexico's executive officers were up for election as well all of New Mexico's three seats in the United States House of Representatives. Primary elections were held on June 1, 2010.

Governor and Lieutenant Governor 

Incumbent Governor Bill Richardson (D) was term-limited and thus cannot run to a third consecutive term. The primaries were won by the Lieutenant Governor Diane Denish in the Democratic side and by the district attorney Susana Martinez in the Republican side.

Attorney General 
Incumbent Attorney General Gary King won a second term in office, defeating Republican Matthew E. Chandler.

Secretary of State 
Incumbent Secretary of State Mary Herrera (D) ran for a second term in office, but was defeated by the Republican Dianna Duran.

Treasurer 
Incumbent Treasurer James Lewis (D) won a second term in office, defeating Republican Jim Schoonover.

Auditor 
Incumbent Auditor Hector Balderas (D) won a second term in office, defeating Republican Errol Chavez.

Land Commissioner 
Incumbent Land Commissioner Patrick H. Lyons (D) was term-limited and thus could not run to a third consecutive term. He was succeeded by the former Land Commissioner Ray Powell.

References 

 
New Mexico